The Maryland Interscholastic Athletic Association (M.I.A.A.) is a boys' sports conference for private high schools generally located in the Baltimore metropolitan area but extending to various other regions, including the state's mostly rural Eastern Shore.  The M.I.A.A. has 27 member schools and offers competition in 17 sports.  In most sports, it offers multiple levels of competition, including Varsity, Junior Varsity, and Freshmen-Sophomore teams, and the conference is broken down by separate leagues in each. In addition, members are sorted in accordance to continual performance; categories include 'A', 'B', or 'C'  Conferences. Teams of the Association (League) may move up or down according to their performance spanning over the course of a year or so to maintain the competition at appropriate levels. Such levels vary for each sport; a school with a "B-Conference" lacrosse team can have an "A-Conference" soccer team: it all depends on the athletic performance of that particular sport.

Seven members of the M.I.A.A. (along with non-MIAA member St. Maria Goretti) also form the Baltimore Catholic League in boys basketball. In addition, many of the same schools compete in the simultaneously organized, all-female "Interscholastic Athletic Association of Maryland" in various girls' sports, together with the all-female schools of the same region.

Sports

"Fall"
 Cross Country
 Football
 Soccer
 Volleyball
 Water Polo

"Winter"
 Basketball
 Ice Hockey
 Indoor Track & Field
 Squash
 Swimming
 Wrestling

"Spring"
 Baseball
 Golf
 Lacrosse
 Rugby
 Tennis
 Track & Field

History

Formed in 1994, the M.I.A.A., was the successor organization for boys to the former "Maryland Scholastic Association", formed in 1919, through the leadership of Dr. Phillip H. Edwards, then a coach and later decade-long principal of the Baltimore City College high school (third oldest public high school in America, founded 1839) and joined later in a formation meeting by several other prominent principals, coaches and athletic directors in that World War I era. 

The M.S.A. was composed of the competing public high schools of the City of Baltimore in the Baltimore City Public Schools along with the various Roman Catholic (archdiocesan and various religious orders) and other religious schools, along with independent private schools with a secular background in the Baltimore metropolitan area, including Baltimore City, Baltimore County, Anne Arundel County, Harford County, Carroll County, and Howard County. 

Occasionally exhibition or pre-season games were played with public and private schools from other counties in Maryland as they were founded, such as Frederick County along with the Washington, D.C. suburbs of the Montgomery and Prince George's Counties and the separate athletic league in the District of Columbia. It was inspired by the hope that all economic classes, educational backgrounds and religious traditions would be able to compete together on the field, in the arena or stadium or in the pool. 

In 1956, two years after the "Brown vs. Board of Education of Topeka, Kansas" Supreme Court decision, which resulted in the immediate integration of Baltimore City's schools, racial integration in the old M.S.A. occurred by including the several formerly "colored" schools in Baltimore City (Frederick Douglass High School and Paul Laurence Dunbar Community High School).

The integration process differed from the competing current statewide Maryland Public Secondary Schools Athletic Association (M.P.S.S.A.A.) which ranks its member schools' teams on the basis of the population numbers of boys and girls in each school's student body. Rather the MSA allowed for those schools which had a "track record" and tradition that outweighed the physical size and numbers of its student body and ranked or classified them according to "power." Conferences were set up as 'A',  'B', and 'C' Conference with occasional yearly movement between levels of play, adjusted at the request of the school. 

As a result, schools like Dunbar and later Lake Clifton were in the 'A' Conference for basketball, even though their numbers of students were smaller than some other schools. City College, Polytechnic Institute, Edmondson High, Calvert Hall and Loyola High were always ranked in the 'A' Conference for football, while Mount St. Joseph's and Gilman were successful wrestling, Loyola and Calvert Hall were in the swimming 'A' Conference, and Patterson High, Southern High and City College excelled in soccer. City, Edmondson, and Northern High were successful in track and field, while schools that excelled in baseball included Archbishop Curley, Cardinal Gibbons, and Patterson High. 

Championships were rewarded by presentations of polished mahogany wooden plaques with round bronze medallions mounted on them with engraved plates. Later, framed certificates with script calligraphy listing the team members were awarded. The highlighted feature of the MSA and the Baltimore area's sports scene were the championships, covered heavily by the three local daily newspapers, radio stations and TV sports announcers. Awards given included the "Scholar - Athlete Award" and the "Charles P. McCormick Unsung Hero Award" televised by a local station sponsored by McCormick & Company. 

Special attention was paid with the traditional Thanksgiving Day "double-header" at old Memorial Stadium, re-constructed 1950-1954 on 33rd Street, where the Colts and Orioles played. Here was played the annual "Calvert Hall-Loyola Game" match-up of Catholic secondary schools at usually 10 am and the afternoon "City-Poly Game" of public high schools at 2 pm, each attracting media and TV/radio coverage plus as many as 30,000 people in attendance, especially in the pre-"Super Bowl" days. 

City-Poly's series rivalry is among the oldest among any public high schools, private schools, colleges or universities in the nation, dating back to 1889, with "Calvert Hall-Loyola" of the private schools following from its roots around 1920.

Member schools
 
St Paul VI Catholic
Annapolis Area Christian School
Archbishop Curley High School
Archbishop Spalding High School
Beth Tfiloh Dahan Community School
The Boys' Latin School of Maryland
Calvert Hall College (high school)
Chapelgate Christian Academy
Concordia Preparatory School
Cristo Rey Jesuit High School
The Friends School of Baltimore
Gerstell Academy
The Gilman School
Glenelg Country School
Jemicy School
The John Carroll School
The Key School
Loyola High School (at Blakefield)
The McDonogh School
Mount Saint Joseph College (high school)
Our Lady of Mount Carmel High School
The Park School of Baltimore
The Severn School
St. Frances Academy
St. John's Catholic Preparatory School (formerly St.John's Literary Institution)
St. Mary's High School
The St. Paul's School
St. Vincent Pallotti High School
Saints Peter & Paul High School
Indian Creek School

References

External links
 Official website

Maryland high school sports conferences